Sexual Misconduct of the Middle Classes is a 2020 play written by Canadian playwright Hannah Moscovitch.  It is the winner of the 2021 Governor General's Literary Award for English-language drama. The play was published by Playwrights Canada Press in 2021.

Plot 
After his third divorce, a novelist and star lecturer is tortured with self-loathing when he notices himself liking a pupil — a girl in a red coat.  The girl turns out to be a major fan of his work and who just so happens to live down the street from him.

Dates, venues, and companies 
Following a first reading in the United States, Sexual Misconduct of the Middle Classes has been performed for audiences in Canada and in Australia.
 2017 - Seattle Repertory Theatre, Seattle, Washington (first reading)
 2020 - Tarragon Theatre, Toronto, Ontario (premiere)
 2021 - Southbank Theatre, The Sumner, Melbourne, Australia (Melbourne Theatre Company)

Canadian crew 
The play had its first reading in June 2017 at the Seattle Repertory Theatre in Seattle, Washington and had its world premiere at the Taragon Theatre, in Toronto, Ontario, known for its development, creation and encouragement of new work in Canada.

Cast  
 Annie: Alice Snaden
 Jon: Matthew Edison

Creative team  
 Hannah Moscovitch – Playwright
 Sarah Garton Stanley – Director
 Eva Barrie – Assistant Director
 Michael Gianfrancesco – Set Designer
 Michael Gianfrancesco – Costume Designer
 Bonnie Beecher – Lighting Designer
 Hilary Pitman – Assistant Lighting Designer
 Julian Iacob – Assistant Lighting Designer
 Miquelon Rodriguez – Sound Designer
 Laura Warren – Video Designer
 Joanna Falck  – Dramaturge
 Siobhan Richardson – Intimacy Coach

Production  
 Daniel Oulton – Stage Manager
 Jaimee Hall – Apprentice Stage Manager
 Jahnelle Jones-Williams – Resident Student

Staff  
 Gerry Egan – Production Manager
 John Thomson – Technical Director
 Kathleen Johnston – Head of Wardrobe
 Shaw Forgeron – Interim Head of Properties
 Andrew Chute

Australian crew

Cast  
 Annie: Izabella Yena
 Jon: Dan Spielman

Creative team  
 Petra Kalive – Director
 Marg Horwell – Set and Costume Designer
 Rachel Burke – Lighting Designer
 Darius Kedros – Composer and Sound Designer
 Isabella Vadiveloo – Assistant Director
 Michala Banas – Intimacy Coordinator
 Xanthe Beesley – Movement Consultant

Awards 
Sexual Misconduct of the Middle Classes won the Governor General's Award for English-language drama at the 2021 Governor General's Awards.

Reception 
The play has generally been well received in both Canada and Australia.  In Toronto, Joe Szekeres, chief critic for the Onstage Blog writes, "Canadian playwright Hannah Moscovitch viscerally overturned the #metoo movement on its head with a sizable goose egg bump at the premiere",  and Carly Maga, theatre critic at the Toronto Star calls Moscovitch, "in control of her narrative, which she increasingly makes clear in her characterizations", claiming it to be "a powerful thing to witness."  In Melbourne, Jane Mulkerrins at The Age adds the play explores "deftly subverting traditional tropes within the age-old story of a student-teacher affair".

References

External links 
 

2020 plays
Canadian plays
Governor General's Award-winning plays